Baron Cornwallis is a title that has been created twice, once in the Peerage of England and once in the Peerage of the United Kingdom. The holders of the first creation were later made Earl Cornwallis and Marquess Cornwallis, but these titles are now extinct. For information on the first creation, see the Earl Cornwallis.

The second creation came in the Peerage of the United Kingdom in 1927 when the Conservative politician Fiennes Cornwallis was created Baron Cornwallis, of Linton in the County of Kent. He had previously represented Maidstone in Parliament and served as chairman of the Kent County Council from 1910 to 1930. He was the son of Fiennes Cornwallis (who had been born Fiennes Wykeham-Martin but had assumed the surname of Cornwallis by Royal licence in 1859), son of Charles Wykeham-Martin and Lady Jemima Isabella, daughter of James Mann, 5th Earl Cornwallis. The first Baron's second but eldest surviving son, the second Baron, also served as chairman of the Kent County Council and was Lord Lieutenant of Kent.  the title is held by the latter's grandson, the fourth Baron, who succeeded in March 2010. His wife, Sara, serves as Deputy Lieutenant of Perth and Kinross.

Barons Cornwallis, First creation (1661)
see Earl Cornwallis

Barons Cornwallis, Second creation (1927)
Fiennes Stanley Wykeham Cornwallis, 1st Baron Cornwallis (1864–1935)
Wykeham Stanley Cornwallis, 2nd Baron Cornwallis (1892–1982)
Fiennes Neil Wykeham Cornwallis, 3rd Baron Cornwallis (1921–2010)
Fiennes Wykeham Jeremy Cornwallis, 4th Baron Cornwallis (born 1946)

The heir apparent is the present holder's son the Honourable Fiennes Alexander Wykeham Martin Cornwallis (born 1987).

See also
Earl Cornwallis
Cornwallis (disambiguation)

References
Kidd, Charles; Williamson, David (editors). Debrett's Peerage and Baronetage (1990 edition). New York: St Martin's Press, 1990. 

 
Baronies in the Peerage of the United Kingdom
Baron
1661 establishments in England
1852 disestablishments in England
1927 establishments in the United Kingdom
Noble titles created in 1661
Noble titles created in 1927
Noble titles created for UK MPs
Extinct baronies in the Peerage of England